Eliška Klučinová (born 14 April 1988 in Prague) is a Czech heptathlete. In 2007, she won a silver medal at the European Athletics Junior Championships in Hengelo.

Career 
At the 2007 European Athletics Junior Championships in Hengelo, Klučinová finished second in the heptathlon with a points total of 5709.

At the 2009 World Championships in Athletics in Berlin, Klučinová placed 23rd overall in the heptathlon with 5505 points.

Klučinová equalled the 22-year-old national record in heptathlon with a points total of 6268 at the 2010 TNT – Fortuna Meeting in Kladno. Klučinová was nine weeks old when Zuzana Lajbnerová set the record in 1988. Two years later, at the same meet, she was able to break the national record with a total of 6283 points. She has since set two new national records.

Achievements

References

External links 

 

1988 births
Living people
Athletes from Prague
Czech heptathletes
Olympic athletes of the Czech Republic
Athletes (track and field) at the 2012 Summer Olympics
Athletes (track and field) at the 2016 Summer Olympics
World Athletics Championships athletes for the Czech Republic
Czech pentathletes
Czech female athletes
Universiade medalists in athletics (track and field)
Universiade bronze medalists for the Czech Republic
21st-century Czech women